Khrylyovka is a rural locality in Prilepsky Selsoviet Rural Settlement, Konyshyovsky District, Kursk Oblast, Russia. Population:

Geography 
The village is located on the Platavka River (a left tributary of the Svapa River), 50 km from the Russia–Ukraine border, 70 km north-west of Kursk, 9 km south-west of the district center – the urban-type settlement Konyshyovka, 9.5 km from the selsoviet center – Prilepy.

 Climate
Khrylyovka has a warm-summer humid continental climate (Dfb in the Köppen climate classification).

Transport 
Khrylyovka is located 55.5 km from the federal route  Crimea Highway, 30 km from the road of regional importance  (Fatezh – Dmitriyev), 8.5 km from the road  (Konyshyovka – Zhigayevo – 38K-038), 3 km from the road  (Lgov – Konyshyovka), on the road of intermunicipal significance  (Shirkovo – Khrylyovka – Shustovo), 6 km from the nearest railway halt Maritsa (railway line Navlya – Lgov-Kiyevsky).

The rural locality is situated 76 km from Kursk Vostochny Airport, 159 km from Belgorod International Airport and 278 km from Voronezh Peter the Great Airport.

References

Notes

Sources

Rural localities in Konyshyovsky District